Elżbieta Bocian (8 April 1931 – 18 June 2013) was a Polish sprinter. She competed in the women's 100 metres at the 1952 Summer Olympics.

References

External links
 

1931 births
2013 deaths
Athletes (track and field) at the 1952 Summer Olympics
Polish female sprinters
Olympic athletes of Poland
People from Świecie County
Sportspeople from Kuyavian-Pomeranian Voivodeship
Lechia Gdańsk athletes
Olympic female sprinters